The Toyota COMS is a single-seater electric microcar produced by Toyota Auto Body. The first generation was introduced by Araco in 2000. In 2012, Toyota Auto Body launched a second generation.

History and technical details

First generation

The first-generation COMS was introduced by Araco in June 2000.

Its estimated maximum range is 35 or 45 kilometres depending on specs, and the battery is fully charged in 8, 10, or 13 hours using a 100 V home grid. The battery pack is made up of six 12 V lead-acid batteries, which provide 32 Ah of power for the  range models and 52 Ah of power for the  range models.

The COMS has two trims: basic (with a roof) and open (without a roof). The basic trim has two models, the AK10E and AK15E (the latter of which is the only model with a  range). The open trim has a single model, the AK11E.

This generation sold about 2,000 units.

Second generation
A show car of the second-generation COMS was unveiled at the 2007 Tokyo Motor Show, with the production version being introduced by Toyota Auto Body in July 2012.

The car has a full-charge range of 50 kilometres under JC08, and fully charges in about 6 hours using a 100 V home grid. The 12 V lead-acid battery pack has a capacity of 52 Ah. The second-generation COMS also has various comfort improvements compared to its predecessor: a more comfortable ride, a driving position comparable to that of a larger car, and a turning radius of 3.2 metres. The car frame is made up of steel. The car's suspension is made up of MacPherson struts in the front and a beam axle in the rear, with front disc brakes and rear drum brakes.

While the production car only has one seat, there were plans to install an extra seat and seat belt in the cargo area that would "[convert] the COMS into a two-passenger vehicle allowed on public roads."

Trims and revisions
The second-generation COMS is offered in two trims: the P-COM for individual use and the B-COM for business use. The B-COM has three body variations: delivery, deck, and basic.

In April 2022, Toyota Auto Body introduced a revised COMS. There were other minor changes as a longer charging cable and styling revisions.

In October 2022, the company launched a special limited version of the P-COM trim to commemorate the tenth anniversary of the COMS launching. The version's equipment includes aluminium wheels, sun visors and accessory sockets. It also has a two tone colouring scheme exclusive for the model as an optional.

Markets and sales
In Indonesia, the COMS is only used as a rental car for tourists in Nusa Dua, Bali, alongside the Toyota C+pod.

, the second-generation COMS has sold 9,500 units.

See also
 Toyota i-Road

Notes

References

External links

COMS
Cars introduced in 2000
Electric city cars
Production electric cars